The Gleaner (or Pelter)-class gunboat was a class of six gunboats built for the Royal Navy in 1854 for use in the Crimean War.

Design
The Gleaner class was designed by W.H. Walker (who also designed the subsequent  and es). The ships were wooden-hulled, with steam power as well as sails, but of shallow draught for coastal bombardment in the shallow waters of the Baltic and Black Sea during the Crimean War.

Propulsion

Armament
Ships of the class were armed with one 68-pounder smooth bore muzzle loading cannon (SBML), one 32-pounder SBML (originally two 68-pounder SBMLs were planned but the forward gun was substituted by a 32-pounder) and two 24-pounder howitzers.

Ships

References

Bibliography

Gunboat classes
 Gleaner
Gunboats of the Royal Navy